Brice Jefferson Dahité is a New Caledonian footballer, who plays for Hienghène Sport and, previously, the New Caledonia national football team. He was a part of the Hienghène Sport squad which won the 2019 OFC Champions League, scoring a goal in the historic semi-final win over Team Wellington FC.

International career

International goals
Scores and results list New Caledonia's goal tally first.

Honours

Club
Hienghène Sport
OFC Champions League: 2019

References

External links 
 
 

1991 births
Living people
New Caledonian footballers
New Caledonia international footballers
Association football forwards
2016 OFC Nations Cup players
Hienghène Sport players